Cool Whip is an American brand of imitation whipped cream, referred to as a whipped topping by its manufacturer, Kraft Heinz. It is used in North America as a topping for desserts, and in some no-bake pie recipes as a convenience food or ingredient that does not require physical whipping and can maintain its texture without melting over time.

Cool Whip is sold frozen and must be defrosted in the refrigerator before being used. It has a longer shelf life than cream while frozen. On the other hand, it does not have the same flavor and texture as whipped cream, and costs nearly 50% more per ounce. It was originally marketed as being "non-dairy" despite containing the milk protein casein; it now also includes skimmed milk.

Overview 
Cool Whip was introduced in 1966 by the Birds Eye division of General Foods, now part of Kraft Heinz. Within two years of introduction, it became the largest and most profitable product in the Birds Eye line of products. Cool Whip is now the most consumed brand of whipped topping in the U.S.

Cool Whip was created in 1966 by food scientist William A. Mitchell. The key advantage of his invention was that the product could be distributed frozen.

Cool Whip is manufactured in Avon, New York, for the American and Canadian markets. It is sold frozen in eight-ounce (226-gram) and larger plastic tubs and is refrigerated prior to serving. Each nine-gram serving provides 25 kcal (105 kJ) of energy, of which 1.5 grams or 15 kcal (63 kJ) are from fat.

Varieties offered include Original, Extra Creamy, Light, Free (fat-free), and Sugar-Free (made with NutraSweet). In Canada, the fat-free variety is labeled as Ultra-low Fat. Seasonal flavors include French vanilla, chocolate, and sweet cinnamon, all introduced in 2011; strawberry; peppermint, introduced in 2016; and cheesecake, introduced in 2017.

Cool Whip remains the most popular brand of whipped topping in the United States, with Reddi-wip (whipped cream in an aerosol can) ranking second. Dream Whip is another brand of whipped dessert topping, but one that is sold as a powder.

Ingredients 
Cool Whip Original is made of water, hydrogenated vegetable oil (including coconut and palm kernel oils), high fructose corn syrup, corn syrup, skimmed milk, light cream (less than 2%), sodium caseinate, natural and artificial flavor, xanthan and guar gums, polysorbate 60, sorbitan monostearate, sodium polyphosphate, and beta carotene (as a colouring). Cool Whip is available in an aerosol can using nitrous oxide as a propellant.

From its introduction, Cool Whip was labeled and advertised as non-dairy, but as of 2018 it contains skimmed milk and sodium caseinate, a milk derivative. Even before the skimmed milk was introduced, Cool Whip was classified in Jewish dietary traditions as dairy because of the sodium caseinate.

See also 
 Dream Whip, a powder
 Miracle Whip, a Kraft-brand mayonnaise substitute
 Non-dairy creamer, with similar ingredients
 Reddi-Wip, whipped cream in a can

References

General and cited references 
 William Shurtleff, Akiko Aoyagi, History of Non-dairy Whip Topping, Coffee Creamer, Cottage Cheese, and Icing/Frosting (With and Without Soy) (1900-2013): Extensively Annotated Bibliography and Sourcebook, SoyInfo Center, 2013

External links 
 

Products introduced in 1966
Brand name desserts
Kraft Foods brands
Imitation foods